No Poison No Paradise is the fifth studio album by American rapper Black Milk. The album was released on October 15, 2013, by Fat Beats and Computer Ugly Records. The album was primarily produced by Black Milk himself, and includes guest appearances from artists such as Mel, Ab, Dwele, Black Thought, Quelle Chris, Tone Trezure and Robert Glasper.

Track listing

Charts

References

2013 albums
Black Milk albums
Fat Beats Records albums
Albums produced by Black Milk